FantaCo Enterprises was an American comic book store and publishing company founded and created by Thomas Skulan and based in Albany, New York. As a publisher, FantaCo was known for its idiosyncratic line-up of mostly black-and-white titles, including the humorous Hembeck Series and the horror title Gore Shriek. FantaCo also published "The Chronicles Series", which cataloged top-selling Marvel Comics titles. In its later years, FantaCo published mostly horror comics and a small number of "good girl art".

FantaCo began as a mail order company and comic book store before branching out into publishing books, magazines, and comics. From 1979 through 1990, it also hosted FantaCon, a popular Albany-area comics and horror convention. (After FantaCo's demise, Skulan brought back FantaCon in 2013.)

History 
FantaCo Enterprises began in 1978 as a mail order company and comic book store located at 21 Central Avenue in Albany. The name was short for either "Fantasy Company" or the "Fantastic Company," depending on Skulan's mood. Many of the store's employees, including publisher/owner/editor Tom Skulan, Mitch Cohn, Roger Green, and Raoul Vezina, worked on FantaCo titles in many creative capacities.

Comics 
FantaCo's first foray into publishing was Raoul Vezina's Smilin’ Ed, about a rat with the personality of a 1950s children TV host. Smilin'Ed was also the store's emblem. Vezina drew Smilin’ Ed from 1980 until his death in 1983.

The company made its mark in the early 1980s with The Hembeck Series, seven volumes of comics by Fred Hembeck. These magazine-sized black-and-white books poked loving fun at the mainstream comics industry, with Hembeck himself appearing as a cartoon interlocutor with the superheroes he interviewed. During this period, FantaCo also published The Fantaco Chronicles Series, edited by Mitch Cohn and Roger Green, which exhaustively documented popular Marvel Comics titles such as the X-Men, Fantastic Four, Daredevil, Avengers, and Spider-Man. A two-issue series was published during this period, Gates of Eden, which featured comics about the 1960s by an impressive array of talent, including John Byrne, Steve Leialoha, Michael T. Gilbert, Trina Robbins, Hembeck, Foolbert Sturgeon, P. Craig Russell, Rick Geary and Spain Rodriguez.

1986 saw the debut of the horror anthology Gore Shriek, initially edited by Skulan, and later issues by Stephen R. Bissette, who also contributed stories to each issue. Besides Skulan and Bissette, other Gore Shriek creators of note included Greg Capullo, Bruce Spaulding Fuller, Eric Stanway and Gurchain Singh. Gore Shriek Volume 1 ran for three years, and is still fondly remembered by horror fans as one of the top comics in that genre. Gore Shriek Delectus (1989) collects much of the best material from the first volume.

FantaCo revived Gore Shriek in 1990 and started a new line of horror and zombie-related titles and one-shots. This period was noteworthy for the career jump-starts it gave to young creators like Chynna Clugston (Bloodletting), Steve Niles  (Night of the Living Dead: London), and Jim Whiting (King of the Dead, Kill Me Slowly, Scab, and Uptown Zombies).

From about 1995, the company's titles shifted to the good girl art of Tom Simonton's Amazon Woman comics, and titillating titles like Babes & Biomechanics, Lady Dracula, and Dead Chicks in Lace: Bloodletting Lingerie Special.

FantaCo/Tundra 
From 1991 to 1994, the company co-published a number of Kevin Eastman projects with Eastman's company Tundra Press. Books under the FantaCo/Tundra imprint included Infectious, No Guts or Glory, and Zombie War. These projects petered out once Tundra folded in 1993. (Eastman and Skulan revived Zombie War in full color under the IDW Publishing imprint, with a graphic novel released in the summer of 2014.)

Books and magazines 
FantaCo published books and magazines in addition to comics.  Their first book being Mug Shots in 1980, a book of cartoons by John Caldwell. Later on, FantaCo published more trade books on the subjects of horror films; splatter films; exploitation films; an early guide to horror, science fiction, and fantasy films on videocassette; and even a straight-ahead horror novel, Ninth and Hell Street. John McCarty authored three books published by FantaCo, and Chas Balun wrote four.

In a similar horror vein, they put out the FantaCo Horror Yearbook and Price Guide every year from 1978 until 1996; magazines like Barbara Steele: An Angel for Satan, Demonique 4, and the Comics Enquirer; twelve issues of Dread: The Official Clive Barker Newsletter in 1992–1993; and Clive Barker and Zombie War commemorative card sets.

The book Amazon Women: The Art of Tom Simonton, edited by Tim D'Allaird, was FantaCo's final publication in the 1990s, right on the eve of their storefront closure in 1998. Mr. Skulan went into semi-retirement and FantaCo Enterprises remained dormant until 2013.

FantaCon 
FantaCo owner Thomas Skulan also hosted FantaCon, a popular Albany-area horror convention and comic book convention that was preferred by many to the "over-crowded Fangoria events." FantaCons lasted from 1979 to 1990, skipping only the years 1982 and 1984–1987.

After a 23-year hiatus, Skulan launched FantaCon's revival, which took place on September 14 and 15, 2013, at the Marriott Hotel in Albany. The City of Albany, including Mayor Jerry Jennings, wholeheartedly embraced and promoted the event with two additional days of events on September 12 and 13. Mayor Jennings kicked off the event at The Palace Theatre, followed by the official 45th-anniversary showing of the original 1968 cult classic film Night of the Living Dead.  Following the film, some of the original cast members (Russ Streiner, Judith O'Dea, George Kosana, Judith Ridley, John A. Russo and Kyra Schon) came on stage for an intimate Q&A session.

Storefront closure 
With the mid-1990s bursting of the speculation bubble, combined with the decline in demand for comic books, in general, in conjunction with an untenable situation with a large corporate distributor, Skulan decided to close the storefront.  FantaCo's mail order operations continued. In 2016 FantaCo Publishing was revived with the publication of Smilin' Ed Comics, in honor of FantaCo co-founder Raoul Vezina. The company currently publishes about one title per month.

Comic book titles (chronologically)

1980 
 The Hembeck Series (1980–1983)
 #1 Hembeck: The Best of Dateline: @!!?# (1980)—originally published by Eclipse Comics and later re-issued by FantaCo
 #2 Hembeck 1980 (1980)
 #3 Abbott and Costello Meet the Bride of Hembeck (1980)
 #4 Bah, Hembeck! (1980)
 #5 The Hembeck File (1981)
 #6 Jimmy Olsen's Pal, Fred Hembeck (1981)
 #7 Dial H for Hembeck (1983)
 Smilin' Ed Comics (1980–1983)

1981 
 Alien Encounters
 FantaCo's Chronicles Series (1981–1983)
 #1 The X-Men Chronicles (Dec. 1981)
 #2 The Fantastic Four Chronicles (Feb. 1982)
 #3 The Daredevil Chronicles (Apr. 1982)
 #4 The Avengers Chronicles (June 1982)
 #5 The Spider-Man Chronicles (Aug. 1982)
 Chronicles Annual (1983)

1982 
 Déjà Vu
 Gates of Eden

1986 
 Gore Shriek vol. I (1986–1989)
 (This is) Sold Out (1986–1987)

1989 
 Gore Shriek Delectus
 Shriek

1990

 Gore Shriek vol. II (1990–1991, including an Annual)

1991 
 Night of the Living Dead (1991–1992); collected in Night of the Living Dead (1991) , Night of the Living Dead/Two (1992) , and Night of the Living Dead/Three (1992) 
 Night's Children
 Vault of Screaming Horror

1992 
 Danger Brain
 Night's Children: Vampyr
 Scab
 Shriek Special
 Tales of Screaming Horror
 Uptown Zombies

1993 
 Blood & Kisses (1993–1994)
 Girl Squad X
 Kill Me Slowly
 Night of the Living Dead: London
 Official Comics Enquirer Swimsuit Price Guide Annual

1994 
 Air Warriors
 Amazon Woman (1994–1996, including some Specials)
 Attack of the Amazon Girls
 Blood Gothic
 King of the Dead
 Night of the Living Dead (sometimes referred to as "Zombie Genesis", based on the first issue's story)
 Rabid
 Sand Demon
 Weird West

1995 
 Amazon Tales
 Babes & Biomechanics
 Bloodletting (1995–1996)
 Heatseaker
 Lady Dracula

1996 
 Badderdude
 Dead Chicks in Lace: Bloodletting Lingerie Special
 Permwoman

1997 
 Amazing Colossal Amazon Woman
 Amazon Woman Beach Party 
 Amazon Woman Christmas Special

1998 
 Amazon Woman: Jungle Album trade paperback 
 Clash of the Amazing Colossal Women

Fantaco/Tundra publications 
 No Guts or Glory (1991)
 Zombie War (1992)
 Zombie War: Earth Must Be Destroyed! (1993–1994)
 Infectious (1994)

Books published
 Mug Shots: A Splendid Collection of Cartoons, by John Caldwell (1980)
 Splatter Movies: Breaking the Last Taboo: A Critical Survey of the Wildly Demented Sub-Genre [sic?] of the Horror Film That Is Changing the Face of Film Realism Forever, by John McCarty (1981) 
 Video Screams: The Official Source Book to Horror, Science Fiction, Fantasy, and Related Films on Videocassette and Disk, by John McCarty (1982) 
 The Amazing Herschell Gordon Lewis and His World of Exploitation Films, by Daniel Krogh with John McCarty (1983) 
 Horror Holocaust, by Chas Balun (1986) 
 The Gore Score, by Chas Balun (1987) 
 Midnight Marquee #37, edited by Gary J. Svehla (1988) 
 Herschell Gordon Lewis' Blood Feast (1988) 
 The Deep Red Horror Handbook, by Chas Balun (1989) 
 Ninth and Hell Street, by Chas Balun (1990) 
 Famous Monsters Chronicles, edited by Dennis Daniel (1992) 
 Connoisseur's Guide to Contemporary Horror Film: The Best of the Beasts and Blood (1993) 
 Freaks of the Heartland, by Steve Niles (1995) 
 Amazon Women: The Art of Tom Simonton, edited by Tim D'Allaird (1998) 
 Gorgo Attacks! edited by John Walter Szpunar (2022)

Cartoonists associated with FantaCo Enterprises
 Stephen R. Bissette
 Greg Capullo
 Chynna Clugston
 Bruce Spaulding Fuller
 Fred Hembeck
 Wendy Lang-Snow
 Steve Niles
 Tom Simonton
 Gurchain Singh
 Raoul Vezina
 Jim Whiting

References

Notes

Sources consulted 

 
 
 Bails, Jerry. Who's Who of American Comics Books, 1928–1999 online.
 Bissette, Stephen R. "Recap on the Gore Shriek Memories: What Came Before," SRBissette.com (Aug. 17, 2008).
 "FantaCo vs Bissette", The Comics Journal #138 (Oct. 1990), p. 18.

 
Companies disestablished in 1998
Defunct comics and manga publishing companies
Lists of comics by publisher
Publishing companies established in 1978